A spin chain is a type of model in statistical physics. Spin chains were originally formulated to model magnetic systems, which typically consist of particles with magnetic spin located at fixed sites on a lattice. A prototypical example is the quantum Heisenberg model. Interactions between the sites are modelled by operators which act on two different sites.

They can be seen as a quantum version of statistical lattice models, such as the Ising model.

History 
The most prominent example of a spin chain is the Heisenberg spin chain, described by Werner Heisenberg in 1928. A simple version of the model was solved, that is, the spectrum of the Hamiltonian was determined, by Hans Bethe using the Bethe ansatz. Now the term Bethe ansatz is used generally to refer to many ansatzes used to solve exactly solvable problems in spin chain theory.

Another example of (a class of) spin chains is the Gaudin model, described by Michel Gaudin in 1976

Mathematical description 
The lattice is described by a graph  with vertex set  and edge set .

The model has an associated Lie algebra . More generally, this Lie algebra can be taken to be any complex, finite-dimensional semi-simple Lie algebra . More generally still it can be taken to be an arbitrary Lie algebra.

Each vertex  has an associated representation of the Lie algebra , labelled . This is a quantum generalization
of statistical lattice models, where each vertex has an associated `spin variable'.

The Hilbert space  for the whole system is then viewed as a tensor product of the representation spaces at each vertex: 

A Hamiltonian is then an operator on the Hilbert space. In the theory of spin chains, there are possibly many Hamiltonians which mutually commute. This allows the operators to be simultaneously diagonalized. 

There is a notion of exact solvability for spin chains, often stated as determining the spectrum of the model. In precise terms, this means determining the simultaneous eigenvectors of the Hilbert space for the Hamiltonians of the system as well as the eigenvalues of each eigenvector with respect to each Hamiltonian.

Examples 
  Heisenberg spin chain
 Gaudin model

Spin 1/2 XXX model 

The prototypical example, and a particular example of the Heisenberg spin chain, is known as the spin 1/2 Heisenberg XXX model. 

The graph  is the periodic 1-dimensional lattice with -sites.

Explicitly, it can be written 
 
where the 1 denotes identity.

The Hamiltonian is essentially, up to an affine transformation,

with implied summation over index , and where  are the Pauli matrices. The Hamiltonian has  symmetry under the action of the three total spin operators .

The central problem is then to determine the spectrum (eigenvalues and eigenvectors in ) of the Hamiltonian. This is solved by the method of an Algebraic Bethe ansatz, discovered by Hans Bethe and further explored by Ludwig Faddeev.

See also 
 Lattice model (physics)
 Exactly solvable

References

External links 
 Spin chain in nLab

Spin models
Quantum magnetism
Quantum lattice models
Magnetic ordering